Santacruzodon is an extinct genus of cynodonts which existed in Brazil during the Triassic period. The type species is Santacruzodon hopsoni.

Species
Santacruzodon hopsoni, is a species that was collected in 1995 in Santa Cruz do Sul, in the Geopark of Paleorrota, Brazil. This species is linked to Dadadon, found in Madagascar.

References

External links
 Figura
 German Natural History Museum 

Traversodontids
Prehistoric cynodont genera
Late Triassic synapsids of South America
Fossil taxa described in 2003